Julien Tomas (born 21 April 1985) is a French rugby union footballer. He plays as a scrum-half.

Born in Montpellier, Julien Tomas currently plays for Montpellier in the Top 14.

He played for France U-21, where he was World Champion in 2006. He also played for France A, including captaining them.

Tomas was a member of France squad at the 2008 Six Nations Championship, earning his first cap in the match with Italy, which France won by 25-13, on 9 March 2008. He currently has 5 caps for his national team.

References

External links
Julien Tomas International Statistics (In French)
Julien Tomas on itsrugby.co.uk

1985 births
Living people
French rugby union players
Montpellier Hérault Rugby players
Rugby union scrum-halves
France international rugby union players
Sportspeople from Montpellier